Lactating Purple is an album by Helios Creed, released in 1991 through Amphetamine Reptile Records.

Critical reception
Spin called the album "amazing nonmetal heavy metal for science-fiction minds."

Track listing

Personnel 
Musicians
Helios Creed – vocals, guitar, sampler, synthesizer, production
Paul Kirk – bass guitar
Paul Della Pelle – drums
Z Sylver – synthesizer, sampler
Production and additional personnel
Billy Anderson – engineering
Jonathan Burnside – engineering

References

External links 
 

1991 albums
Amphetamine Reptile Records albums
Helios Creed albums
Albums produced by Billy Anderson (producer)